Jason Hatfield is an American actor and voice actor.

He has voiced characters in anime series' such as Blue Submarine No.6 (1999), Voogie's Angel (2000), and the television series You're Under Arrest! (2002–2003). He has also had roles in the films The Conspirator (2010), Little Red Wagon (2012), and the role of "Pittman" in the Showtime series Homeland (2011).

He is also a direct descendant from the feud involving the Hatfields and McCoys, being the great great grandson of Valentine “Uncle Wall” Hatfield, "Devil Anse" Hatfield’s oldest brother.

Born in Atlanta, Georgia, he has one older sibling. He currently resides in Durham, North Carolina working as a middle school social studies teacher. 

As of August 2019, he is the co-host of a podcast titled The History Bros along with fellow teachers Jason Rude, and Brian Geldmacher. In the podcast, they discuss various historical events that have occurred in the United States. While the focus of the podcast is intended for historical education, episodes are enhanced with satire and other humorous anecdotes.

References

American male voice actors
Living people
American male film actors
Actors from Atlanta
Year of birth missing (living people)